I Can Get It for You Wholesale is a musical, produced by David Merrick, music and lyrics by Harold Rome, and book by Jerome Weidman, based on his 1937 novel of the same title.  It marked the Broadway debut of 19-year-old Barbra Streisand, who was nominated for the Tony Award for Best Performance by a Featured Actress in a Musical. The story is set in the New York City Garment District in 1937, during the Great Depression, and the songs utilize traditional Jewish harmonies evocative of the setting and the period of the show.

Background
In the album Just for the Record, Streisand recalls, "My first audition for the show was on the morning after Thanksgiving in 1961. Since the action took place in the 1930s, I showed up in a '30s fur coat that I'd bought in a thrift shop for $10. I sang three songs, including my new standby "A Sleepin' Bee".  They asked me to come back and gave me "Miss Marmelstein" to learn for my second audition a few hours later." Harold Rome said, "The 'Miss Marmelstein' number was written before the casting of Barbra Streisand in the role, but her part was then enlarged. Somebody is that good ... you try to use them as much as possible."

Productions
The 1951 film with the same title is based very loosely on the original novel.

The musical premiered on Broadway at the Shubert Theatre on March 22, 1962. Directed by Arthur Laurents and choreographed by Herbert Ross, it starred Elliott Gould as Harry Bogen. In addition to Streisand in the small role of Bogen's secretary, Miss Marmelstein, the supporting cast included Lillian Roth as Mrs. Bogen and Marilyn Cooper as Ruthie Rivkin, with Harold Lang, Bambi Linn, Ken LeRoy, and Sheree North. On October 1, it transferred to The Broadway Theatre, where it closed on December 9 after a total run of two previews and 300 performances. Gould and Streisand later married.

In 1991, the American Jewish Theatre staged a revival directed and choreographed by Richard Sabellico. The production starred Evan Pappas as Bogen, Carolee Carmello as Ruthie, Jim Brachitta as Teddy, and Vicki Lewis as Miss Marmelstein. It was nominated for the Outer Critics Circle Award as Best Revival, and Best Actor in a Musical for Pappas.

In 2002, Arcola Theatre in London, a former clothes factory, produced the show for its second anniversary. The director was Mehmet Ergen with co-director William Galinsky.

Plot
Harry Bogen is an ambitious, unscrupulous young businessman in the 1930s New York City garment industry. He will stop at nothing to get to the top: he lies to his mother and his long-suffering girlfriend, Ruthie Rivkin, who try to help him become a better person, but he embezzles company funds from Apex Modes and betrays his friends and partners. Harry leaves Ruthie to take up with Martha Mills, a gold-digging dancer in Club Rio Rhumba, as tough and hard as the diamonds Harry rewards her with. But Harry goes bankrupt and loses his fairweather friends. Only his mother and Ruthie stand by him, but there is a surprising ally to re-emerge from the past.

Casts

Songs 

Act I
 Overture
 I'm Not a Well Man - Miss Marmelstein and Mr. Pulvermacher
 The Way Things Are - Harry Bogen
 When Gemini Meets Capricorn - Ruthie Rivkin and Harry Bogen
 Momma, Momma, Momma - Harry Bogen and Mrs. Bogen
 The Sound of Money - Harry Bogen, Martha Mills, Mitzi, Mario and Eddie
 The Family Way - Mrs. Bogen, Harry Bogen, Ruthie Rivkin, Teddy Asch, Blanche Bushkin and Meyer Bushkin
 Too Soon - Mrs. Bogen
 Who Knows? - Ruthie Rivkin
 Have I Told You Lately? - Blanche Bushkin and Meyer Bushkin
 Ballad of the Garment Trade - Miss Marmelstein, Ruthie Rivkin, Blanche Bushkin, Harry Bogen, Teddy Asch, Meyer Bushkin and Company

Act II
 A Gift Today - Sheldon Bushkin, Harry Bogen, Mrs. Bogen, Blanche Bushkin, Meyer Bushkin and Ruthie Rivkin
 Miss Marmelstein - Miss Marmelstein
 The Sound of Money (Reprise) - Harry Bogen
 A Funny Thing Happened - Ruthie Rivkin and Harry Bogen
 What's in It for Me? - Teddy Asch and Martha Mills
 What Are They Doing to Us Now? - Miss Marmelstein, Buggo, Tootsie Maltz, Manette, Gail, Miss Springer and Creditors
 Eat a Little Something - Mrs. Bogen and Harry Bogen
 Epilogue - The Company

Recording

The original cast recording was released by Columbia Records. According to Gary Marmorstein, "Columbia badly wanted Harold Rome's I Can Get it For You Wholesale. As an inducement to Rome [Goddard] Lieberson offered to record the twenty-fifth anniversary version of his International Ladies' Garment Workers' Union show Pins and Needles."

Goddard Lieberson, who produced the Wholesale cast album for Columbia Records, signed Streisand to a contract, and her first solo album was released two months after the show closed.

Response
The musical garnered mixed reviews and lost money despite a run of 300 performances. As theatre historian Ken Mandelbaum noted, How to Succeed in Business Without Really Trying had opened five months earlier with a similar, but more palatable, story. J. Pierrepont Finch is a much more "cuddly betrayer... and audiences were less willing to confront Wholesale's unflinching portrayal of Harry's little world of "men and ulcers on parade... that shouldn't detract from the fact that it was a daring and distinctive musical.".

Howard Taubman of The New York Times wrote that the show generated a "lot of momentum" and added, "It is spirited in its appreciation of the garment-trade milieu, and both winning and tearfully sentimental in its treatment of Jewish folks and some of their Bronx folkways." He thought the score was pleasant, using "folklife motifs to distill the flavor of Jewish life." Saving the most lavish praise for last, he wrote that Streisand was the "evening's find... a girl with an oafish expression, a loud irascible voice and an arpeggiated laugh.  Miss Streisand is a natural comedienne."

The Time critic observed, "Wholesale relies heavily on Jewish folk and speech ways. But as comedy, Jewish dialect is in awkward transition, no longer funny and not yet English. Harold Rome's score is drab and his lyrics resemble either singing dialogue or nursery rhymes... Harold Lang and Sheree North make a scorching sex rite out of 'What's In It for Me?'... Barbra Streisand trips the show into stray laughs. For the rest, Wholesale is as quiet as Seventh Avenue on Yom Kippur."

Notes

References 
Guinness Who's Who of Stage Musicals, editor Colin Larkin, 
'I Can Get It For You Wholesale" interview and production notes, barbra-archives.com 
Playbill from the Shubert Theatre

External links

 Internet Broadway Database listing, I Can Get It For You Wholesale
Plot and production information at Guide to Musical Theatre
Detailed description and analysis of the show
Information from Stage Agent

1962 musicals
Musicals based on novels
Broadway musicals
Musicals about the Great Depression